Denis Dempsey  (1826 – 10 January 1896) was an Irish recipient of the Victoria Cross, the highest and most prestigious award for gallantry in the face of the enemy that can be awarded to British and Commonwealth forces.

Details
He was approximately 31 years old, and a private in the 1st Battalion, 10th Regiment of Foot (later The Lincolnshire Regiment), British Army during the Indian Mutiny when the following deed took place on 12 August 1857 at Lucknow, India for which he was awarded the VC:

Further information
He later emigrated to Canada and died in Toronto on 10 January 1886. He is buried in Saint Michael's Cemetery, Toronto.

References

Listed in order of publication year 
The Register of the Victoria Cross (1981, 1988 and 1997)

Ireland's VCs (Dept of Economic Development, 1995)
Monuments to Courage (David Harvey, 1999)
Irish Winners of the Victoria Cross (Richard Doherty & David Truesdale, 2000)

External links

 

1826 births
1896 deaths
People from Bray, County Wicklow
Royal Lincolnshire Regiment soldiers
Irish recipients of the Victoria Cross
Indian Rebellion of 1857 recipients of the Victoria Cross
Irish emigrants to Canada (before 1923)
British Army recipients of the Victoria Cross